Barth is a railway station in the town of Barth, Mecklenburg-Vorpommern, Germany. The station lies on the Velgast-Barth railway and the train services are operated by Deutsche Bahn.

Train services
The station is served by the following service:

Local services  Barth - Velgast

References

Railway stations in Mecklenburg-Western Pomerania
Railway stations in Germany opened in 1888
Buildings and structures in Vorpommern-Rügen